The 1988/89 South Australian Individual Speedway Championship was the 1988/89 version of the South Australian Individual Speedway Championship organised by the Speedway Riders Association of South Australia and sanctioned by Motorcycling Australia. The final took place on 23 December 1988 at the North Arm Speedway in Adelaide.

The title was won by defending champion Craig Hodgson who finished unbeaten on the night. Four times SA Champion Mark Fiora finished in second, beaten only by Hodgson in heat 19 while Shane Parker defeated Ashley Norton in a run-off for 3rd and 4th place after both had finished on 11 points.

1988/89 South Australian Solo Championship
 23 December 1988
  Adelaide, North Arm Speedway
 Referee: Sam Bass
 Qualification: The top two riders go through to the Australian Final at the Motordrome in Newcastle.

Classification

References

See also
 Australia national speedway team
 Sport in Australia

Speedway in Australia